Jonathan Nurse (born 21 April 1885, date of death unknown) was a Guyanese cricketer. He played in four first-class matches for British Guiana from 1909 to 1922.

See also
 List of Guyanese representative cricketers

References

External links
 

1885 births
Year of death missing
Guyanese cricketers
Guyana cricketers